was a folk rock band consisting of three members. They formed in 1996 at the Osaka University of Arts and made their big debut in 2004 and were signed to Ki/oon Records. One of their more distinctive aspects is the incorporation of the traditional Okinawan instrument, the Sanshin, into their music.

Their song Parade was used as the 12th ending theme to the anime series Naruto.

They disbanded on April 7, 2008.

Members

Discography
Album
 Chaba (November 6, 2003)
 The Best of Chaba Kinema Rock Yūgi (November 6, 2003)
  (August 18, 2004)
  (August 2, 2006)

External links
 Sony Music Japan Chaba website 

Japanese pop music groups
Ki/oon Music artists